Bigoa Nyuon (born 18 May 2001) is a professional Australian rules footballer playing for the Richmond Football Club in the Australian Football League (AFL). He played his first AFL match on 14 May 2022 against Hawthorn Football Club.

Statistics
Updated to the end of round 23, 2022.

|-
| 2020
| 
| 47 || 0 || – || – || – || – || – || – || – || – || – || – || – || – || – || –
|-
| 2021
| 
| 47 || 0 || – || – || – || – || – || – || – || – || – || – || – || – || – || –
|- 
| 2022
|  || 47 || 1 || 0 || 0 || 2 || 4 || 6 || 0 || 2 || 0.0 || 0.0 || 2.0 || 4.0 || 6.0 || 0.0 || 2.0
|- class="sortbottom" 
! colspan=3| Career
! 1
! 0
! 0
! 2
! 4
! 6
! 0
! 2
! 0.0
! 0.0
! 2.0
! 4.0
! 6.0
! 0.0
! 2.0
|}

Personal life
Nyuon was born in Nairobi, Kenya to a family of South Sudanese people. His sister Nyadol Nyuon is a lawyer and human rights activist.

References

Living people
2001 births
Richmond Football Club players
South Sudanese emigrants to Australia
Sportspeople of South Sudanese descent
South Sudanese players of Australian rules football
VFL/AFL players born outside Australia
South Sudanese refugees
Australian rules footballers from Melbourne
Refugees in Kenya